is a Japanese actor who has appeared in a number of feature films and television series. He graduated from Nihon University High School and Nihon University College of Art. He is represented with Toho Entertainment.

Filmography

TV series

Films

Stage

Video games

See also
Yasuko Sawaguchi

References

External links
  

Nihon University alumni
1960 births
Living people
Male actors from Tokyo